Bezirk Zwettl is a district of the state of Lower Austria in Austria.

Municipalities 
Suburbs, hamlets and other subdivisions of a municipality are indicated in small characters.
 Allentsteig
 Allentsteig, Bernschlag, Reinsbach, Thaua, Zwinzen
 Altmelon
 Altmelon, Dietrichsbach, Dürnberg, Fichtenbach, Großpertenschlag, Kleinpertenschlag, Kronberg, Kronegg, Marchstein, Perwolfs, Schwarzau
 Arbesbach
 Arbesbach, Brunn, Etlas, Haselbach, Kamp, Neumelon, Pretrobruck, Purrath, Rammelhof, Schönfeld, Schwarzau, Wiesensfeld
 Bärnkopf
 Echsenbach
 Echsenbach, Gerweis, Großkainraths, Haimschlag, Kleinpoppen, Rieweis, Wolfenstein
 Göpfritz an der Wild
 Almosen, Breitenfeld, Georgenberg, Göpfritz an der Wild, Kirchberg an der Wild, Merkenbrechts, Scheideldorf, Schönfeld an der Wild, Weinpolz
 Grafenschlag
 Bromberg, Grafenschlag, Kaltenbrunn, Kleingöttfritz, Kleinnondorf, Langschlag, Schafberg, Wielands
 Groß Gerungs
 Aigen, Albern, Antenfeinhöfe, Blumau, Böhmsdorf, Dietmanns, Egres, Etlas, Etzen, Frauendorf, Freitzenschlag, Griesbach, Groß Gerungs, Groß Meinharts, Haid, Harruck, Häuslern, Heinreichs, Hypolz, Josefsdorf, Kinzenschlag, Klein Gundholz, Klein Reinprechts, Klein Wetzles, Kotting Nondorf, Marharts, Mühlbach, Nonndorf, Ober Neustift, Ober Rosenauerwald, Oberkirchen, Preinreichs, Reitern, Schall, Schönbichl, Siebenberg, Sitzmanns, Thail, Wendelgraben, Wurmbrand
 Großgöttfritz
 Engelbrechts, Frankenreith, Großgöttfritz, Großweißenbach, Kleinweißenbach, Reichers, Rohrenreith, Sprögnitz
 Gutenbrunn
 Gutenbrunn, Ulrichschlag
 Kirchschlag
 Bernhardshof, Eck, Gaßles, Kienings, Kirchschlag, Merkengerst, Pleßberg, Roggenreith, Scheib, Schneeberg
 Kottes-Purk
 Bernhards, Dankholz, Doppl, Elsenreith, Ensberg, Ernst, Felles, Fohra, Gotthardschlag, Gschwendt, Günsles, Heitzles, Hörans, Kalkgrub, Koppenhof, Kottes, Leopolds, Münichreith, Pfaffenschlag, Pötzles, Purk, Reichpolds, Richterhof, Runds, Schoberhof, Singenreith, Teichmanns, Trittings, Voirans, Voitsau, Weikartschlag, Wernhies
 Langschlag
 Bruderndorf, Bruderndorferwald, Fraberg, Kainrathschlag, Kasbach, Kehrbach, Kleinpertholz, Kogschlag, Langschlag, Langschlägerwald, Mittelberg, Mitterschlag, Münzbach, Reichenauerwald, Schmerbach, Siebenhöf, Stierberg, Streith
 Martinsberg
 Edlesberg, Kleingerungs, Kleinpertholz, Loitzenreith, Martinsberg, Mitterndorf, Oed, Pitzeichen, Poggschlag, Reitzendorf, Thumling, Walpersdorf, Weixelberg, Wiehalm
 Ottenschlag
 Bernreith, Endlas, Jungschlag, Neuhof, Oedwinkel, Ottenschlag, Reith
 Pölla
 Altpölla, Döllersheim, Franzen, Kienberg, Kleinenzersdorf, Kleinraabs, Krug, Neupölla, Nondorf, Ramsau, Reichhalms, Schmerbach am Kamp, Waldreichs, Wegscheid am Kamp, Wetzlas
 Rappottenstein
 Aggsbach, Arnreith, Dietharts, Grossgundholz, Grötschen, Grünbach, Hausbach, Höhendorf, Kirchbach, Kleinnondorf, Lembach, Neustift, Oberrabenthan, Pehendorf, Pfaffendorf, Pirkenreith, Rappottenstein, Reichenbach, Riebeis, Ritterkamp, Roiten, Selbitz
 Sallingberg
 Armschlag, Grainbrunn, Großnondorf, Heubach, Kamles, Kleinhaslau, Lugendorf, Moniholz, Rabenhof, Sallingberg, Spielleithen, Spielleithen, Voitschlag
 Schönbach
 Aschen, Dorfstadt, Fichtenhöfen, Grub im Thale, Klein-Siegharts, Lengau, Lichtenau, Lohn, Pernthon, Schönbach
 Schwarzenau
 Ganz, Großhaselbach, Hausbach, Limpfings, Modlisch, Schlag, Schwarzenau, Stögersbach
 Schweiggers
 Großreichenbach, Kleinwolfgers, Limbach, Mannshalm, Meinhartschlag, Perndorf, Reinbolden, Sallingstadt, Schwarzenbach, Schweiggers, Siebenlinden, Streitbach, Unterwindhag, Vierlings, Walterschlag, Windhof
 Traunstein
 Biberschlag, Dietmanns, Gürtelberg, Haselberg, Hummelberg, Kaltenbach, Pfaffings, Prettles, Schönau, Spielberg, Stein, Traunstein, Walterschlag, Weidenegg
 Waldhausen
 Brand, Gutenbrunn, Hirschenschlag, Königsbach, Loschberg, Niedernondorf, Niederwaltenreith, Obernondorf, Rappoltschlag, Waldhausen, Werschenschlag, Wiesenreith
 Zwettl
 Annatsberg, Bernhards, Böhmhöf, Bösenneunzen, Edelhof, Eschabruck, Friedersbach, Gerlas, Germanns, Gerotten, Gradnitz, Großglobnitz, Großhaslau, Gschwendt, Guttenbrunn, Hörmanns, Hörweix, Jagenbach, Jahrings, Kleehof, Kleinmeinharts, Kleinotten, Kleinschönau, Koblhof, Marbach am Walde, Mayerhöfen, Merzenstein, Mitterreith, Moidrams, Negers, Neusiedl, Niederglobnitz, Niederneustift, Niederneustift, Niederstrahlbach, Oberstrahlbach, Oberwaltenreith, Ottenschlag, Purken, Ratschenhof, Rieggers, Ritzmannshof, Rosenau Dorf, Rosenau Schloss, Rottenbach, Rudmanns, Schickenhof, Syrafeld, Unterrabenthan, Unterrosenauerwald, Uttissenbach, Waldhams, Wolfsberg, Zwettl Stift, Zwettl

 
Districts of Lower Austria